Helsinki Halli is currently the biggest entertainment venue in Finland, with many artists having performed at the arena, spanning a wide range of music genres. It was known as "Hartwall Areena" in 1997–2014 and as "Hartwall Arena" in 2014–2022.

Other events 

The venue also hosted the first and so far the only Eurovision Song Contest in Finland, after the country's victory in the Eurovision Song Contest in Athens.

References 

Lists of events by venue
Events in Helsinki